Cocotitlán is a town and municipality, in State of Mexico in Mexico. The municipality covers an area of 10.45 km².

As of 2010, the municipality had a total population of 12,142.

References

Mexico City metropolitan area
Municipalities of the State of Mexico
Populated places in the State of Mexico